The 2019 Chelmsford City Council election took place on 2 May 2019 to elect members of Chelmsford City Council in England. This was on the same day as other local elections.

Results summary 
The Liberal Democrats made their largest gains in the country in Chelmsford, gaining 26 seats. These 26 gains were all to the expense of the Conservatives who lost 31 seats during the elections here. The other five Conservative losses went to three independent and two South Woodham Ferrers Council Taxpayers Association candidates.

|-

Ward results 
Source: Chelmsford City Council website

Bicknacre and East and West Hanningfield

Boreham and The Leighs

Broomfield and The Walthams

Chelmer Village and Beaulieu Park

Chelmsford Rural West

Galleywood

Goat Hall

Great Baddow East

Great Baddow West

Little Baddow, Danbury and Sandon

Marconi

Moulsham and Central

Moulsham Lodge

Patching Hall

Rettendon and Runwell

South Hanningfield, Stock and Margaretting

South Woodham - Chetwood and Collingwood

South Woodham - Elmwood and Woodville

Springfield North

St. Andrew's

The Lawns

Trinity

Waterhouse Farm

Writtle

By-elections

Marconi
A by-election was held in Marconi ward on 7 November 2019 after the resignation of Cllr Catherine Finnecy.

Moulsham Lodge

A by-election was held following the resignation of Cllr. Mark Springett in March 2020.

Writtle

A by-election was held in Writtle ward on 1 July 2021 following the death of sitting Councillor Malcolm Watson. The major issues during the campaign were the proposed 850-home Warren Farm development within Writtle parish and the City Council's proposal to charge for parking at Hylands Park.

Little Baddow, Danbury & Sandon

A by-election was called due to the resignation of Cllr Bob Shepherd.

References 

May 2019 events in the United Kingdom
2019 English local elections
2019
2010s in Essex